These are the songs that reached number one on the Top 50 Best Sellers chart in 1953 as published by Cash Box magazine.

See also
1953 in music
List of number-one singles of 1953 (U.S.)

References
https://web.archive.org/web/20110818052004/http://cashboxmagazine.com/archives/50s_files/1953.html

1953
1953 record charts
1953 in American music